Ian Burrell (born February 15, 1985) is an American long distance runner who specialises in the marathon. He finished in 25th place in the marathon event at the 2015 World Championships in Athletics in Beijing, China.

References

External links
 

1985 births
Living people
American male long-distance runners
American male marathon runners
World Athletics Championships athletes for the United States
Place of birth missing (living people)
21st-century American people